In mathematics, Strassmann's theorem is a result in field theory. It states that, for suitable fields, suitable formal power series with coefficients in the valuation ring of the field have only finitely many zeroes.

History

Statement of the theorem
Let K be a field with a non-Archimedean absolute value | · | and let R be the valuation ring of K. Let f(x) be a formal power series with coefficients in R other than the zero series, with coefficients an converging to zero with respect to | · |. Then f(x) has only finitely many zeroes in R. More precisely, the number of zeros is at most N, where N is the largest index with |aN| = max  |an|.

As a corollary, there is no analogue of Euler's identity, e2πi = 1, in Cp, the field of p-adic complex numbers.

See also 

 p-adic exponential function

References

External links
 

Field (mathematics)
Theorems in abstract algebra